Cluj may refer to
Cluj-Napoca, county seat of Cluj County, named Cluj until 1974
Cluj County, Romania
Cluj-Napoca International Airport
U Cluj, a Romanian sports club
CFR Cluj, a Romanian football club